John Chester Williams (born September 12, 1953) is a retired archer from the United States. After placing second at the 1969 World Championships he won the 1971 and 1972 world titles and the gold medal at the 1972 Olympics. It was the first Olympic archery medal for the United States in 52 years.

Williams briefly attended Texas A&M University, and graduated in business and management from the California State University, San Bernardino. He later worked as a product manager for the archery division of Yamaha Corporation.

In 2003, the National Archery Association issued him its J. Maurice Thompson award, named after the body's founder, for outstanding and meritorious service to the sport. Northwestern High School has a plaque in the lobby honoring John Williams.

References

1953 births
Living people
People from Erie County, Pennsylvania
American male archers
Archers at the 1972 Summer Olympics
Olympic gold medalists for the United States in archery
Sportspeople from Pennsylvania
Medalists at the 1972 Summer Olympics